Jack Logan (born 8 September 1995) is an English professional rugby league footballer who plays as a  for the York City Knights in the RFL Championship.

He previously played for Hull F.C. in the Super League, and has spent time on loan from Hull at Doncaster, Hull Kingston Rovers in the Super League and the Toronto Wolfpack in the Betfred Championship. He has also played for the Batley Bulldogs in the RFL Championship, and on loan from Batley at FC in the top flight.

Background
Logan was born in Kingston upon Hull, Humberside, England.

Playing career

Hull FC
On 18 July 2014, Logan made his début for Hull in their 2014 Super League match against Wigan at the DW Stadium.

Doncaster RLFC
Logan is dual registered with Doncaster in the Championship, and has played 2 games for the club.

Toronto Wolfpack
Logan spent time on loan at the Toronto Wolfpack in the Betfred Championship during the 2019 season.

Batley Bulldogs
On 22 Feb 2021 it was reported that he had signed for the Batley Bulldogs in the RFL Championship.

Hull F.C. (loan)
On 22 Jun 2021 it was reported that he had signed for Hull F.C. in the Super League on loan.

Leigh Centurions
On 4 Aug 2021 it was reported that he had signed for the Leigh Centurions in the Super League.

York City Knights
On 13 Nov 2021 it was reported that he had signed for York City Knights in the RFL Championship.

References

External links
Hull FC profile
SL profile

1995 births
Living people
Batley Bulldogs players
Doncaster R.L.F.C. players
English rugby league players
Hull F.C. players
Hull Kingston Rovers players
Leigh Leopards players
Rugby league centres
Rugby league players from Kingston upon Hull
Toronto Wolfpack players
York City Knights players